State Highway 88, abbreviated to SH-88 or OK-88, is a state highway in Oklahoma. It runs for 26.0 miles (42 km) north–south through Rogers County. It has no lettered spur routes.

SH-88 dates back to 1940 or early 1941.

Route description
SH-88 begins in Inola and heads northwest out of town, paralleling a Union Pacific rail line. It has an interchange with an old alignment of SH-33, followed by an interchange with SH-33's successor, U.S. Highway 412. From US-412, the route continues northwest, crossing over Inola Creek near its source. Approximately one mile later, the highway passes near the McFarlin railroad siding. Further northwest, the highway passes through unincorporated Tiawah. It then crosses the Tiawah Hills and Panther Creek.  The highway then passes under Interstate 44, the Will Rogers Turnpike, though no interchange exists. It then enters the town of Claremore. 

In Claremore, SH-88 has a brief concurrency with both SH-66 and SH-20. After emerging from the west side of town, the highway turns onto a due north course, which it continues along until it reaches Lake Oologah. It then turns west, running along the south shore of the lake. Upon reaching the lake's southwest corner, it crosses the dam. The highway turns back to the north, running west of the lake, before turning back west toward Oologah. It then ends at US-169 in Oologah.

History
State Highway 88 is first shown on the April 1941 state highway map, implying it was commissioned sometime between then and April 1940, when the previous map was published. SH-88 had an entirely gravel surface at that time. The 1948 map is the first that shows SH-88 with a wholly paved driving surface.

Prior to the construction of the Lake Oologah Dam, Highway 88 proceeded on a more southerly course north of Claremore, crossing the Verdigris River downstream of the current dam location and ending at US-169 south of Oologah. The 1965 map is the first to show the route crossing Oologah Dam. The route has had no further major changes since then.

Junction list

References

External links

SH-88 at Roadklahoma

088
Transportation in Rogers County, Oklahoma